Sreekaryam is a city locality in Trivandrum, capital of Kerala, India. It is located 3 kms north of Ulloor and is about 11 kms away from Thiruvananthapuram Central Railway Station. It is situated midway between Kazhakoottam and Palayam It is almost 6 kms far  from Kazhakoottam. The College of Engineering Trivandrum (CET) is situated near Sreekaryam.  The headquarters of ICAR-Central Tuber Crops Research Institute (ICAR-CTCRI) is also located at Sreekaryam.

Sreekaryam comes under Kazhakkoottam legislative assembly constituency and Thiruvananthapuram Lok Sabha constituency.

Transportation 
National Highway 66, which connects Mumbai and Kanyakumari passes through Sreekaryam.

See also 

 Ulloor
 Kazhakootam

References

Suburbs of Thiruvananthapuram